Aaron Lucas (born December 14, 1979) is an American retired professional basketball player, who played for various clubs in Europe.

High school
After getting an opportunity to play varsity late into his freshman year, Lucas went on to garner several All Region Team selections, All State selection, Beach Ball and Hooters Holiday Tournament MVP's, North/South All Star, McDonald's All American (game nominee) and Nike All American as well as 1998 South Carolina Player of the Year.

College career
Lucas college basketball played for NCAA Division I's South Carolina's Gamecocks, along with future Lietuvos Rytas stars Marijonas Petravičius and Chuck Eidson. He averaged 10.4 ppg, 2.4 rpg and 3.9 apg during his senior year.

Professional playing career 
After graduating University of South Carolina, Lucas briefly played for Columbia Range, a basketball team in Columbia. Lucas left the club and came to Lietuvos Rytas, where he instantly became its leader. Having an impressive vertical jump and dunking ability, he won the 2003 LKL "Oro Karalius", a competition similar to the NBA Slam Dunk Contest. In 2004, he was loaned to Bnei HaSharon, but returned to his former team in spring of 2005. In May 2005, he terminated his contract and signed with JSF Nanterre. He last played for BC Kyiv in 2007.

References

External links
Eurobasket.com Profile

Living people
1979 births
American expatriate basketball people in France
American expatriate basketball people in Israel
American expatriate basketball people in Lithuania
American expatriate basketball people in Turkey
American expatriate basketball people in Ukraine
BC Kyiv players
BC Rytas players
Bnei HaSharon players
Nanterre 92 players
Mersin Büyükşehir Belediyesi S.K. players
Sportspeople from Greenville, South Carolina
South Carolina Gamecocks men's basketball players
American men's basketball players
Point guards